Raci Şaşmaz (born 30 October 1973) is a Turkish film producer, writer and actor.

Filmography
 The Hunter writer (TV series: 2001)
 Ekmek Teknesi producer & writer (TV series: 2002)
 Valley of the Wolves producer, writer & actor as Ali Candan (TV series: 2003–2005)
 Valley of the Wolves: Iraq producer & writer (Film: 2006)
 Valley of the Wolves: Terror producer & writer (TV series: 2007)
 Esref Saati producer & writer (TV series: 2007)
 Valley of the Wolves: Ambush producer & writer (TV series: 2007–2014)
 Muro: Damn the Humanist Inside producer & writer (Film: 2008)
 Separation producer & writer (TV series: 2009)
 Valley of the Wolves: Gladio producer & writer (Film: 2009)
 Valley of the Wolves: Palestine as Polat Alemdar (Film: 2011)
 Bandits Don't Rule the World producer & writer (TV series: 2015–present)

References

External links

Turkish writers
Turkish male television actors
1973 births
Living people
Zaza_people